Robert Bentley Haines, Jr. (born March 27, 1954) is an American sailor and Olympic champion. Born in San Diego, California, he has won seven world championships in 4 different class of boats. He was associate producer and sailing team manager for the Walt Disney film "Morning Light". He was awarded the Congressional Gold Medal for being a member of the 1980 US Olympic Sailing Team, which did not compete in the Soviet Union (Estonia) due to the boycott of the Olympic Games that year by President Jimmy Carter.

Haines, skipper of the Haines-Trevelyan-Davis team, received a gold medal in the Soling class at the 1984 Summer Olympics in Los Angeles. Haines was inducted into the San Diego Sports Hall of Fame in 2018.

References

External links

1954 births
Living people
Congressional Gold Medal recipients
American male sailors (sport)
Medalists at the 1984 Summer Olympics
North American Champions Soling
Olympic gold medalists for the United States in sailing
Sailors at the 1984 Summer Olympics – Soling
Sportspeople from San Diego
Soling class world champions